Throw Down is the debut studio album by Canadian country music artist Tim Hicks. It was released on August 27, 2013 via RGK Entertainment Group/Open Road Recordings. It debuted at number 16 on the Billboard Canadian Albums Chart for the week of September 14, 2013.

Throw Down was nominated for Country Album of the Year at the 2014 Juno Awards.

Critical reception
Kayla Tinson of Top Country gave the album four stars out of five, writing that it is "aptly named, packed full of fun-inducing party songs you’ll want to listen to again and again."

Track listing

Chart performance

Album

Singles

References

External links 

2013 debut albums
Tim Hicks albums
Open Road Recordings albums